The Royal Naval Barracks, Chatham, also known as HMS Pembroke, was a UK naval barracks that was built between the Victorian Steam Yard and Brompton Barracks from 1897 to 1902. It was built on the site of a prison built in 1853 to house over 1,000 convicts, with the intention that they would be used to build the Dockyard extension.

Background
During the Age of Sail, the Royal Navy manned its ships either by recruitment or impressment; crew were retained for as long as they were needed and then usually dismissed when their ship was paid off at the end of a voyage or campaign. The introduction of Long Term Service in 1853, however, prompted the Navy to look at providing more permanent quarters for seamen in home waters. At first, they were almost invariably housed in hulks; it was only towards the end of the century that purpose-built barracks began to be constructed at each of the three principal Royal Navy Dockyards: Chatham, Devonport and Portsmouth.  These barracks were designed to provide not just accommodation but also recreation and training facilities for men who were waiting to be appointed to ships.

History
Designed by Henry Pilkington, construction of the Royal Naval Barracks began in 1897 and was completed by December 1902. By the beginning of the First World War, Chatham was one of the Royal Navy's three ‘manning ports’ – together with Plymouth and Portsmouth—manned by men allocated to the Chatham Division. This role continued until the advent of central manning in 1956. 

In September 1917, the barracks Drill Hall (which was being used as overflow accommodation) suffered a direct hit from two bombs, which killed over 130 men. In 1942, King George VI made a visit to Medway and HMS Pembroke, the Royal Naval Barracks. After the war Chatham became home to the reserve, or standby fleet.

In 1957, the barracks and gunnery school were closed due to the local port divisions being replaced; however in 1959 the barracks re-opened as the Royal Naval Supply School, who trained staff in supply and secretarial work. When the Commander-in-Chief, The Nore, the regional operational commander appointment, was discontinued in March 1961, the barracks were being used as an accommodation centre for the re-fitting crews of the dockyard. The Drill Shed and Canteen were being used by the Dockyard. In 1970, all Naval establishments in Chatham were to be combined and known as HM Navy Base, under one officer 'Flag Officer, Medway and Port Admiral'. With the closure of the Dockyard and Naval Base in 1984, HMS Pembroke was also decommissioned; the barracks gates were finally closed on 31 March 1984.

List of Commodores-in-Command
Post holders included:
 Captain Ernest Rice: July 1891 – July 1893 
 Captain Swinton C. Holland: July 1893 – July 1896 
 Captain Robert F. Hammick: July 1896 – October 1898 
 Captain Angus Macleod: October 1898 – May 1901 
 Captain Reginald C. Prothero: May 1901 – October 1902 
 Captain Lewis E. Wintz: October 1902 – July 1904
 Commodore Frederick G.Stopford: July 1904 – May 1907 
 Commodore Edward E. Bradford: May 1907 – December 1908 
 Commodore Ernest C.T. Troubridge: December 1908 – February 1910 
 Commodore Cecil F. Thursby: February 1910 – August 1911 
 Commodore Seymour E. Erskine: August 1911 – April 1913 
 Commodore Ernest F. A. Gaunt: April 1913 – August 1915 
 Rear-Admiral Seymour E.Erskine: August 1915 – July 1918 
 Commodore Harry L. de E. Skipwith: July 1918 – August 1920 
 Commodore Gerald W.Vivian: August 1920 – June 1921 
 Commodore Louis C.S.Woollcombe: June 1921 – May 1922 
 Commodore Alexander V.Campbell: May 1922 – November 1923 
 Commodore Eric J.A.Fullerton: November 1923 – December 1925 
 Commodore Geoffrey Hopwood: December 1925 – December 1927 
 Commodore Hugh S. Shipway: December 1927 – November 1929 
 Commodore Arthur L. Snagge: November 1929 – July 1931 
 Commodore Andrew B. Cunningham: July 1931 – December 1932 
 Commodore Robert C. Davenport: January 1933 – July 1935 
 Commodore John C. Tovey: January 1935 – July 1937 
 Commodore Stuart S. Bonham-Carter: July 1937 – March 1939 
 Commodore Robert L. Burnett: March 1939 – November 1940 
 Commodore R. S. Gresham Nicholson: November 1940 – August 1943 
 Commodore Angus M. B. Cunninghame Graham: August 1943 – January 1945 
 Commodore Marcel H.A. Kelsey: January 1945 – February 1946 
 Rear-Admiral Basil C. B. Brooke: February 1946 – February 1948 
 Commodore John A.S. Eccles: February 1948 – October 1949 
 Commodore Peter G.L. Cazalet: October 1949 – October 1950 
 Commodore Gerald V. Gladstone: October 1950 – May 1952 
 Commdore Geoffrey Thistleton-Smith: May 1952 – November 1953 (later V.Adm.) 
 Commodore Peter L. Collard: November 1953 – November 1955 
 Commodore Hugh C.B. Coleridge: November 1955 – May 1957 
 Commodore John F.D. Bush: May 1957 – March 1959 
 Commodore Lionel W.L. Argles: March 1959 – March 1961

References

Sources

 

Royal Navy shore establishments
Chatham, Kent
Military installations closed in 1984

External links
 Information about the memorial to the victims of the Drill Shed Bombing (which occurred at Chatham on the night of 3 September 1917) from the Imperial War Museum website